The following is the complete filmography of Indian actor, television personality and producer Mithun Chakraborty, who works in Hindi cinema as well as in Bengali cinema. He has portrayed a variety of characters on screen and is also known for his dancing skills.

Films

Television

Music video appearances

Unreleased films
The following is a list of unreleased films featuring Mithun Chakraborty in a proper chronological order. During his long career, Mithun has worked on a number of films which never released.

References

External links

Indian filmographies
Male actor filmographies